Y Lliwedd East Peak is the twin top of Y Lliwedd in the Snowdonia National Park, North Wales. It is only 5 metres shorter than the main summit of Y Lliwedd.

The summit marked by a small pile of stones, the views being similar to Y Lliwedd, except for Gallt y Wenallt being in view.

References

External links
 www.geograph.co.uk : photos of Y Lliwedd and surrounding area

Beddgelert
Mountains and hills of Gwynedd
Mountains and hills of Snowdonia
Nuttalls